Sirarpie Der Nersessian (5 September 18965 July 1989) was an Armenian art historian, who specialized in Armenian and Byzantine studies. Der Nersessian was a renowned academic and a pioneer in Armenian art history. She taught at several institutions in the United States, including Wellesley College in Massachusetts and as Henri Focillon Professor of Art and Archaeology at Harvard University. She was a senior fellow at Dumbarton Oaks, its deputy director from 1954–55 and 1961–62, and a member of its Board of Scholars. Der Nersessian was also a member of several international institutions such as the British Academy (1975), the Académie des Inscriptions et Belles-Lettres (1978), and the Armenian Academy of Sciences (1966).

Biography

Education
Der Nersessian was born the youngest of three children in Constantinople in 1896. She came from a well-to-do family and her maternal uncle happened to be the Armenian Patriarch of Constantinople, Malachia Ormanian. Her parents died while she was still young: her mother Akabi, when she was nine, and her father Mihran, when she was eighteen. She attended the Esayan Academy and the English Girls School in Constantinople, gaining fluency in Armenian, English and French at an early age. In 1915, during the height of the Armenian genocide, Der Nersessian and her sister Arax (by then orphans) were forced to leave for Europe, where they took up residence in Geneva. Der Nersessian studied at the University of Geneva for several years until settling in Paris, France in 1919.

Der Nersessian was admitted to Sorbonne University, studying history at the École des Hautes Études de l'université de Paris. She studied under the notable Byzantinologists Charles Diehl and Gabriel Millet and art historian Henri Focillon. In 1922, she became Millet's assistant, and with his help, published one of her first articles in 1929. The two theses (graduates students then had to submit two theses) that she presented for her doctorat d'etat, "L'illustration du roman de Barlaam et Joasaph" and a paper on Armenian illuminated manuscripts during the late medieval period, were well-received (earning a Mention très honorable), and both of them were awarded with prizes by the Académie des Inscriptions et Belles-Lettres and Revue des Études Grecques when they were published in 1937.

Professor and pioneer
In 1930, Der Nersessian moved to the United States at the suggestion of her three mentors, Byzantinists Charles Rufus Morey, Albert M. Friend Jr., and Walter Cook, becoming a part-time lecturer at Wellesley College in Massachusetts. She taught art history at Wellesley, quickly gaining a full professorship and later becoming the chairwoman of the Department of Art History and Director of Farnsworth Museum. Der Nersessian was the first woman to teach Byzantine art at a woman's college, the first woman to be decorated with the medal of Saint Gregory the Illuminator by Catholicos Vazgen I in 1960, the first woman invited to lecture at the Collège de France in Paris, the only woman in her time to gain full professorship at Dumbarton Oaks, and the second woman to be honored with a gold medal from the Society of Antiquaries of London in 1970. In 1947, she received the Achievement Award from the American Association of University Women.

Der Nersessian remained at Dumbarton Oaks until 1978, when she retired to France and lived with her sister in Paris. Upon retirement, she had her entire library shipped to the Matenadaran in Yerevan, so as to better help Armenian scholars in their studies. Shortly after her death in 1989, an endowment fund for prospective art history students in Armenia, Fonds Sirarpie Der Neressian at the Institut de Recherches sur les Miniatures Arméno-Byzantines, was created in her honor.

Bibliography
Der Nersessian's work primarily concerned Armenian art history, including the study of  church architecture, illuminated manuscripts, miniatures and sculpture. Below is a partial list of books and articles that she authored. Her 1945 book, Armenia and the Byzantine Empire, was praised by art historians David Talbot Rice, Jurgis Baltrušaitis, and Alexander Vasiliev. Vasiliev wrote in his review of the book that she is "the best authority of our day on Armenian history, art, and civilization."

Books
Armenia and the Byzantine Empire. Cambridge, Massachusetts: Harvard University Press, 1945.
Aght'amar: Church of the Holy Cross. Cambridge, Mass.: Harvard University Press, 1964.
Armenian Manuscripts in the Walters Art Gallery. Baltimore: The Trustees, 1973.
Armenian miniatures from Isfahan. Brussels: Les Editeurs d’Art Associés, 1986.
The Armenians. New York: Praeger, 1969.
 L'Art arménien. Paris: Art européen. Publications filmées d'art et d'histoire, 1965.
 L'illustration du roman de Barlaam et Joasaph. Paris: de Boccard, 1937.
Miniature Painting in the Armenian Kingdom of Cilicia from the Twelfth to the Fourteenth Century. Washington D.C.: Dumbarton Oaks Studies, 1993.

Articles
"The Armenian Chronicle of the Constable Smpad or of the 'Royal Historian.'" Dumbarton Oaks Papers, Vol. 13, 1959, pp. 141–168.
"An Armenian Gospel of the Fifteenth Century." The Boston Public Library Quarterly. 1950, pp. 3–20.
 "A General View of the Manuscripts of San Lazarro." Bazmavep. Venice, 1947, pp. 269–272.
"Pagan and Christian Art in Egypt. An exhibition at the Brooklyn Museum." The Art Bulletin. Vol. 33, 1941, pp. 165–167.
"Two Miracles of the Virgin in the Poems of Gautier de Coincy." Dumbarton Oaks Papers, Vol. 41, 1987, pp. 157–163.
"The Kingdom of Cilician Armenia", A History of the Crusades, edited by Kenneth M. Setton, 1969.

References 

1896 births
1989 deaths
Writers from Istanbul
Armenian art historians
French Byzantinists
Wellesley College faculty
Harvard University faculty
University of Paris alumni
Women art historians
Armenians from the Ottoman Empire
Fellows of the Medieval Academy of America
20th-century Armenian historians
20th-century Armenian women writers
Armenian Byzantinists
French women historians
Corresponding Fellows of the British Academy
Scholars of Byzantine history
Women Byzantinists
Women medievalists
20th-century French women writers
Emigrants from the Ottoman Empire to France
Historians of Byzantine art